John Green House or John Greene House may refer to:

John T. Greene House, Sacramento, California, listed on the National Register of Historic Places (NRHP) in Sacramento County, California
John A. Green Estate, Anamosa, Iowa
Jonathan Green House, Stoneham, Massachusetts
John Green House (Huntington Bay, New York)
John Green House (Nyack, New York), listed on the NRHP in Rockland County
John Bunyan Green Farm, Midland, North Carolina

See also
Green House (disambiguation)
Greene House (disambiguation)